Leopoldo Sansone (born 12 March 1987) is an Italian male rower, medal winner at senior level at the European Rowing Championships.

References

External links
 

1987 births
Living people
Rowers from Naples
Italian male rowers